The 2017 Central Arkansas Bears football team represented the University of Central Arkansas in the 2017 NCAA Division I FCS football season. The Bears were led by fourth-year head coach Steve Campbell and played their home games at Estes Stadium. They were a member of the Southland Conference. They finished the season 10–2, 9–0 in Southland play to be crowned Southland Conference champions. They received the Southland's automatic bid to the FCS Playoffs where they lost to New Hampshire in the Second Round.

On December 7, head coach Steve Campbell resigned to become the head coach at South Alabama. He finished at Central Arkansas with a four-year record of 33–15.

Previous season
They finished the season 10–3 overall and 8–1 in Southland play to finish in second place. They received an at-large bid to the FCS Playoffs where they defeated Illinois State in the first round, before losing in the second round to Eastern Washington.

Schedule
Source:  

 *-Indicates Game Broadcast via Tape Delay

Game summaries

at Kansas State

Sources:

at Murray State

Sources:

Southeastern Louisiana

Sources:

Sam Houston State

Sources:

at Houston Baptist

Sources:

Stephen F. Austin

Sources:

at Northwestern State

Sources:

McNeese State

Sources:

at Lamar

Sources:

at Incarnate Word

Sources:

Abilene Christian

Sources:

FCS Playoffs

New Hampshire–Second Round

Sources:

Ranking movements

References

Central Arkansas
Central Arkansas Bears football seasons
Southland Conference football champion seasons
Central Arkansas
Central Arkansas Bears football